The 2021–22 Highland Football League (known as the Breedon Highland League for sponsorship reasons) was the 119th season of the Highland Football League, and the 8th season as part of the fifth tier of the Scottish football pyramid system. Brora Rangers were the reigning champions.

The title was decided during the final round of fixtures with Fraserburgh taking their first league title in twenty seasons thanks to a 5–0 victory over Forres Mechanics. They won the title by three points ahead of Buckie Thistle, who recorded a run of 23 consecutive victories during the campaign, a Highland League record.

Fraserburgh played the winners of the 2021–22 Lowland Football League (Bonnyrigg Rose Athletic) in the Pyramid play-off, losing 3–2 on aggregate.

Teams

To Highland League
Relegated from League Two
Brechin City

Stadia and locations
All grounds are equipped with floodlights as required by league regulations.

League table

Results

Highland League play-off
Play-offs for the final place in the 2022–23 Highland League were planned however no matches took place. As the winners of the 2021–22 Midlands Football League (Carnoustie Panmure) and the 2021–22 North Caledonian Football League (Invergordon) were ineligible for promotion, 2021–22 North Superleague winners Banks O' Dee were put forward to play-off with Fort William, who finished bottom of the Highland Football League. The day before the scheduled first leg, Fort William withdrew due to player eligibility rules. As a result, Banks O' Dee were promoted and Fort William were relegated.

First leg

Second leg

References

External links

Highland Football League seasons
5
SCO